Lisa Lassek is an American film and television editor. In addition to her editing career, her credits include her role as an associate producer for the television series Firefly. She edited episodes for the sixth season of Buffy the Vampire Slayer, served as an assistant editor for Angel, and has edited various episodes of Firefly. Lassek is a frequent collaborator of Joss Whedon, having edited his first feature-length film Serenity and the Marvel Cinematic Universe films, The Avengers and Avengers: Age of Ultron (which she co-edited with Jeffrey Ford). She has also collaborated with Drew Goddard, having edited his films The Cabin in the Woods and Bad Times at the El Royale.

Lassek is a native of Philadelphia, Pennsylvania and is an alumna of Vassar College and Boston University.

Filmography

Film

Television

References

External links

Geekson podcast interviews Lisa Lassek

American film editors
Television producers from Pennsylvania
American women television producers
Boston University alumni
Living people
Businesspeople from Philadelphia
American television editors
Vassar College alumni
American women film editors
Women television editors
1976 births
21st-century American women